Kievnauchfilm, also Kyivnaukfilm, translated as Kyiv Science Film, was a film studio in the former Soviet Union located in Kyiv, Ukrainian SSR. Although it was created in 1941 to produce popular science films, it eventually became best known for its animated films, and remained active in Ukrainian animation for decades.

Description

Its main task was production of popular science films and documentaries covering a broad range of topics. In 1959, Kyivnaukfilm (an abbreviation for "Kyiv Science Films"), under Hippolyte Lazarchuk expanded into animation. In addition, it released 342 animated films, a large number of which are still popular today, such as a series about Zaporozhian Cossacks called Cossacks (directed by Volodymyr Dakhno), Adventures of Captain Wrongel series, Doctor Aybolit, and a version of Treasure Island (all three directed by David Cherkassky). The studio's films received numerous awards at international and national film festivals, such as the World Festival of Animated Film in Zagreb for Iryna Hurvych's How Women Sold Men and the Animated Film Festival in New York.

Film director Felix Sobolev (Animals' Tongue, I and Others, Can Animals Think?) and studio Editor-in-Chief Yevheniy Zahdanskyi are considered to be trailblazers and figures of major influence in the documentary field in the former Soviet Union. By 1966 the studio released over 400 films annually.

With the dissolution of the Soviet Union, Kyivnauchfilm went into decline and was renamed National Cinematheque of Ukraine, and spun off the animation division under the name "Ukranimafilm".

In 1993 Kievnauchfilm produced Unknown Ukraine: Sketches of Our History, a series of 104 films presenting a comprehensive history of Ukraine.

Animation

Doctor Aybolit, director David Cherkassky
Cossacks series (1967-1995), director Volodymyr Dakhno.
How Cossacks cooked Kulish («Как казаки кулеш варили», 1967)
How Cossacks played football («Как казаки в футбол играли», 1970)
How Cossacks rescued the brides («Как казаки невест выручали», 1973)
How Cossacks bought the salt («Как казаки соль покупали», 1975)
How Cossacks became the Olympians («Как казаки олимпийцами стали», 1978)
How Cossacks helped the Musketeers («Как казаки мушкетёрам помогали», 1979)
How Cossacks enjoyed the wedding («Как казаки на свадьбе гуляли», 1984)
How Cossacks met the aliens («Как казаки инопланетян встречали», 1987)
How Cossacks played hockey («Как казаки в хоккей играли», 1995)
Chelovik, kotoryi umel tvorit' chudesa - adaptation of H. G. Wells' "The Man Who Could Work Miracles", Yefrem Pruzhanskyy, director (1969)
How the Hedgehog and the Bear cub Saw the New Year in (1975) 
Как кормили медвежонка (1976)
Музыкальные сказки (1976)
Приключения капитана Врунгеля / Adventures of Captain Wrongel series (1976-1979), director David Cherkassky
Приключения кузнеца Вакулы / Adventures of Vakula the Smith (1977)
Первая зима (1978)
Золоторогий олень (1979)
Как несли стол (1979)
Жили-были матёшки (1981)
Алиса в стране чудес / Alice in Wonderland (1981) 
Through the Looking Glass (1981)
Как было написано первое письмо / How the First Letter Was Written (1984)
Встреча/ The Meeting (1984)
Srazhenie (Russian: Сражение - meaning "Battle"; adaptation of Stephen King's short story "Battleground", directed by Mikhail Titov. (1986)
Три Паньки series (1989-1991)
Три Панька (1989) 
Три Панька хозяйствуют (1990)
Три Панька на ярмарке (1991)
Остров сокровищ / Treasure Island (1988), director David Cherkassky

Popular science / documentaries
The Blown up Dawn, Взорванный рассвет, 1965, director Felix Sobolev
Animals' Language, Язык животных, 1967, director Felix Sobolev
Seven Steps beyond Horizon, Семь шагов за горизонт, 1968, director Felix Sobolev
Can Animals Think? Думают ли животные? 1970, director Felix Sobolev
Myself and Others, Я и другие, 1971, director Felix Sobolev
Indian yogis. Who are they? Индийские йоги — кто они? 1970, director Almar Serebryanikov
Echo of our Emotions, Луна наших эмоций (1977)
People and Dolphins, Люди и дельфины (1983), director Volodymyr Khmelnytskyi
Vavilov's Star, Звезда Вавилова, 1984, director Anatoliy Borsuk, screenwriter Serhiy Dyachenko
Экспертиза одной сенсации, 1985, (about pseudoscience), director Lev Vdovenko
A Footprint, Отпечаток, 1985, director Anatoliy Borsuk
A Man from 6am through Midnight, Человек с шести до полуночи, 1987, (about everyday struggles of a young professional engineer in the Soviet Union), director Andrei Zagdansky
Interpretation of Dreams, Толкование сновидений, 1989, (Freudian interpretation and "equation" of communism and nazism) director Andrei Zagdansky
Rauol Valenberg's Mission, Миссия Рауля Валенберга, 1990, director Alexander Rodnyansky

See also 

 Cinema of Ukraine
 History of Ukrainian animation

References

External links
National Cinemateque of Ukraine website 
Full list of animated films at animator.ru
https://www.youtube.com/ukranima
https://www.linkedin.com/company/-ukranimafilm

 
Mass media companies established in 1941
Ukrainian animation studios
Film production companies of the Soviet Union
Soviet animation studios
1941 establishments in the Soviet Union
Mass media companies disestablished in 1990
1990 disestablishments in Ukraine